Johnston A.F.C. are a Welsh football club from Johnston, Pembrokeshire in the southwest of Wales. They currently play in the Pembrokeshire League Division Two.

History

The club joined the Pembrokeshire League as a division three side for the 1965–66 season, finishing  in eight place. The team's most memorable period was in the 1980s when they won three Division One championships in a row, as well as finishing runners-up on a further four occasions.

Honours

 Pembrokeshire League Division One  - Champions (3) 1980–81; 1981–82; 1982–83
 Pembrokeshire League Division One  - Runners-Up (5): 1979–80; 1983–84; 1985–86; 1987–88; 2012–13
 Pembrokeshire League Division Two  - Champions (1) 1976–77
 Pembrokeshire League Division Two  - Runners-Up (2) 2004–05; 2009–10
 Pembrokeshire League Division Three  - Champions (1): 1980–81 (second team)
 Pembrokeshire League Division Three - Runners-Up (1): 1967–68 
 Pembrokeshire League Division Four - Runners-Up (1): 2010–11 (second tram) 
 Pembrokeshire League Reserves Division Two - Winners (1): 2002–03
 Pembrokeshire League Reserves Division Two - Runners-Up (1): 2004–05
 Pembrokeshire Senior Cup - Winners (3):  1981–82; 1984–85; 2012–13
 Pembrokeshire Senior Cup - Runners-Up (2): 1982–83; 1989–90  
 West Wales Intermediate Challenge Cup – Winners: 2012–13
 West Wales Intermediate Challenge Cup – Runners-Up: 1981–82

References

External links
Official club Twitter

Football clubs in Wales
Sport in Pembrokeshire
Pembrokeshire League clubs